The Araneta family is a Filipino family that originated from Guipúzcoa, the Basque region of northern Spain. The name is derived from the Basque word aran meaning "valley", with the suffix -eta meaning "abundance of", but also a locative term denoting place. In this case, the Araneta name means "the family that comes from the valley"..

Origins

In 1723, during the Galleon Trade, two brothers named Baltazar de Araneta and Don Jose de Araneta arrived in Manila aboard the Spanish Fleet, "La Sacra Familia". They came from the Basque region of Spain by way of Acapulco, Mexico. However, this was not conclusive as some members of the family disputed that the two are not brothers. Don Jose de Araneta must have been born in Gipuzkoa, but not Baltazar de Araneta; he was born in Mexico.

Baltazar served as a regidor of the cabildo and secretary of the Charitable Fraternity of the Misericordia in Manila. He was married to Manuela de Aguirre and he died in Manila in 1750. One line of the Araneta family is descended from him.

In 1725, Don Jose joined the first Spanish expedition forces to Mindanao. A passage quoted from the book (Islas Filipinas: Mindanao Vol.11), by Benito Francia and Julian Gonzales Parrado, which was translated in Chabacano dialect by Datu Michael Mastura, establishes two facts: First, Don Jose de Araneta served the Spanish Politico-Military Government of Mindanao based at Zamboanga City. Second, he served as an interpreter between the Spanish colonial government and the Sultan of Maguindanao, together with Placido Alberto de Saavedra. Another passage in the document revealed that in 1746, Don Jose Araneta was executed in Sulugan, Mindanao, nowadays known as Anuling in Cotabato, Philippines. However, there is conflicting information drawn from translations of various documents pertaining to him.

In 1823, Buenaventura Araneta, son of Mathias Araneta, became the Gobernadorcillo (Alcalde Naturales) in Molo, Iloilo. He married Isabel Theresa Estrella; they had four children: Hermenegildo, Antonio, Pantaleon and Aniceta. Hermenegildo married Petrona Estanislao (Melitante) y Locsin of Iloilo; they had nine children, one of them was Felix who married Paz Soriano y Ditching (daughter of Don Anselmo Soriano y Flores and Maria Ditching of Binondo, Manila) and they had seventeen children, namely Leopoldo, Angel, Isabel, Pablo, Marciano, Gregorio, Anastacio, Maria, Filomena, Rosario, Lina, Jose, Concepcion, Candelaria, Encarnacion, Felicito and Remedios.

19th century and the Philippine Revolution

Buenaventura Araneta was the first member of the family to enter political life when he became the Gobernadorcillo (Alcalde Naturales) of Iloilo.

In the latter part of the century, a kinsman of his on the Negros side; Juan Araneta was the architect of the Negros Revolution that defeated the Imperial Spanish forces in that island. This would lead to the establishment of the Cantonal Republic of Negros. He would serve as Secretary of War of the short-lived government, which was later absorbed into the American-controlled military government of the Philippines. A statue of him stands in the Bago public plaza. Marciano Soriano Araneta (1866–1940) and Anastacio Soriano Araneta (1870 -1898) also participated in combat against the Imperial Spanish forces in Negros and captured the Spanish garrison in Mangkas (now La Carlota City, Negros Occidental).

Other members of the family were involved in the revolution elsewhere. Pablo Soriano Araneta (1864–1943) was the commanding general of the Panay Revolutionary Forces and chief of the expeditionary forces of the Federal Republic of the Visayas (centered on Iloilo City). 
The eminent Gregorio Soriano Araneta (1869–1930), legal luminary, businessman, nationalist, and patriot, served his country and people under three regimes. He was elected a member of the National Assembly representing Iloilo. In 1898, he was appointed by General Emilio Aguinaldo as secretary-general and delegate to the Malolos Republic. Gregorio Araneta became the Secretary of Justice of the Philippine Republic on September 26, 1898.

Gregorio also became a successful and prosperous lawyer in Manila and married Dona Carmen Zaragoza y Roxas, of the prominent Spanish mestizo Zaragoza and Roxas clans of Manila, and established the Araneta name in Manila society for the first time.

20th century

After the end of the revolution and the creation of the Philippine Commonwealth, members of the clan expanded their business and political interests. Juan Araneta went on to establish the Ma-ao Sugar (refinery) Central in his hometown of Bago, Negros Occidental. Industrialist Jorge Araneta would later expand it, and later the barangay where the Central stood was named after him. Jorge was also a close friend of the commonwealth Philippine President Manuel Quezon.

It was Jorge's son-in-law and distant relation, J. Amado Araneta, who made the family into a household name. He established the real estate empire of commercial Cubao. His most prominent achievement is building the Araneta City. Its landmark structure, the Smart Araneta Coliseum, was the world's largest indoor stadium. It still remains one of the largest in Asia. Meanwhile, Amado's son, Jorge L. Araneta, replaced him as the head of the Araneta Group and his father's businesses.

In politics, Salvador Araneta, son of Gregorio Araneta become a Cabinet Secretary in the Philippine government. He was the founder of Araneta University (now De La Salle Araneta University) and FEATI University. Later, his nephew Greggy Araneta married Irene Marcos, the daughter of Philippine President Ferdinand Marcos.

Other members of the clan involved with Marcos was Rafael M. Salas, the son of Ernesto Araneta Salas of Bago. He served as Marcos' Executive Secretary, due to political differences he left this position and later become Under-Secretary-General of the United Nations, head of UNFPA. He would serve in this capacity for 17 years.

Many other members of the clan also serve in various political positions, including Senator Mar Roxas, a grandson of J. Amado Araneta, and former First Gentleman Jose Miguel Arroyo, husband of Philippine former President Gloria Macapagal Arroyo. He is a descendant of Jesusa Araneta Lacson de Arroyo of the Negros branch of the family.

The Araneta family, particularly the descendants of Josefa Araneta, also of the Negros branch, produced the largest numbers of the Catholic clergy. She married Gregorio Varela, and the line of their son Antonio Araneta-Varela has produced three nuns, two priests, and Bishop Jesus Varela. Meanwhile, their daughter, Dolores Araneta Varela, who married Agaton Ramos, had a grandson named Rolando Ramos Dizon, who became a La Sallian Catholic brother before becoming Chairman of the Commission on Higher Education.

Notable members

Politics
Juan Araneta - revolutionary, Secretary of War (Negros Republic)
Gregorio S. Araneta - Secretary of the Malolos Congress
Salvador Araneta - Secretary of Economic Coordination under President Elpidio Quirino, Secretary of Agriculture under President Ramon Magsaysay
Manuel "Mar" Araneta Roxas - grandson of J. Amado Araneta and former  President Manuel Roxas, son of former Senator Gerry Roxas and Judy Araneta Roxas, ex-Trade and Industry Secretary, former Senator, 2010 Vice-Presidential candidate, former DOTC secretary, former DILG Secretary, and 2016 Presidential candidate. 
Gerry Roxas Jr. - brother of the preceding, grandson of J. Amado Araneta and former President Manuel Roxas, Son of former Senator Gerry Roxas and Judy Araneta Roxas, former Representative
Antonio Sebastian "Tonypet" Araneta - writer and activist, husband of Gemma Guerero Cruz
Jose Miguel Arroyo - Husband of former Philippine President Gloria Arroyo, grandson of Jesusa Araneta Lacson de Arroyo
Rafael M. Salas - United Nations Under-Secretary-General, Head UNFPA, son of Ernesto Araneta Salas.
José Yulo - Speaker of the Philippine House of Representatives, wartime Chief Justice, Secretary of Justice, a descendant of the Yulo-Araneta branch, 1957 Presidential candidate
 Cecilia "Cecile" Araneta-Marcos - incumbent Vice Governor of Ilocos Norte. Married to Former Provincial Board Member Mariano "Nonong" Marcos II, nephew of former President Ferdinand Marcos.
Ferdinand Alexander “Sandro” Araneta Marcos III - Senior Deputy Majority Leader of the Philippine House of Representatives, Member of the Philippine House of Representatives from the 1st district of Ilocos Norte, eldest son of President Bongbong Marcos and First Lady Liza Araneta-Marcos, grandson of former President Ferdinand Marcos and former First Lady Imelda Marcos.

Academe
Louise “Liza” Cacho de Araneta-Marcos - lawyer, professor, First Lady of the Philippines, and wife of President Bongbong Marcos 
 Armando "Mando" Araneta Arquiza - Former Acting President of Western Mindanao State University.

Business
Jorge Araneta - an industrialist, owned and expanded some local sugar mills in Bago, Negros Occidental. 
J. Amado Araneta - Founder of the Araneta Group of Companies, which developed the Araneta City in Cubao, Quezon City. He was the original owner of Bacolod-Murcia Milling Company located in Bacolod City.
Jorge L. Araneta - son of J. Amado Araneta and the present head of the Araneta Group. Also a board member to the Philippine Seven Corp.
Gregorio María "Greggy" Araneta III - current chairman of Philweb . He is also chairman, president, and chief executive officer (CEO) of Araneta Properties Inc. (ARA) , He is also the President of Araza Resources Corporation, Envirotest Corporation, Enviroclean Corporation and Carmel Farms Inc. Araneta also serves as chairman of the board of Autobus Transport Systems Inc. (Autobus), Gregorio Araneta Management Corporation, Gregorio Araneta Inc. (GAI), Gamma Holdings Corporation, Carmel Development Corporation and Gamma Properties Inc. He also held various other executive positions to the following companies: ISM Communications Corporation (ISM), Atok-Big Wedge Company Inc.(Atok), Alphaland Corporation (ALPHA), LBC Development Bank (LBC Bank), and Asia International Travel Corporation.
Santiago "Santi" G. Araneta - former chairman and CEO of LBC Express Holdings, Inc..
Dino Araneta - Former President and Chief Strategy Officer of LBC Express Holdings, Inc. and Founder of Quad X.
José María "Joey" A. Concepcion III - incumbent president and CEO of RFM Corporation. He also serves as the Director of Concepcion Industrial, and as the Founder of Go Negosyo, a non-profit organization that aims to reduce poverty in the country by encouraging entrepreneurship and related support systems. He also served as the Presidential Adviser for Entrepreneurship of the Duterte Administration. He is the son of Jose S. Concepcion Jr. and Victoria L. Araneta. He is also a recipient of the Padma Shri Award from India in 2018 for his work and contributions in the trade and industry sectors.

Religion
Jesús Y. Varela - Roman Catholic Bishop, grandson of Antonio Araneta Varela
Rolando Ramos Dizon - Religious, former president of De La Salle University, and former CHED Commissioner. A descendant of Josefa Araneta-Varela.
Fr. Francisco "Fritz" Araneta, SJ - Jesuit priest, President. Ateneo de Manila University

Others
Judy Araneta-Róxas - daughter of J. Amado Araneta; chairperson of the Gerry Róxas Foundation; vice-chair of the Araneta Group.
Margarita A. Forés - Celebrity chef and businesswoman in Manila. Owner of 10 Italian-inspired restaurants including Cibo, Pepato, Café Bola, and Pepato restaurants.  Other businesses include Fiori di M and Casa di M, high-end floral and housewares design, respectively, and the Cibo d M catering arm. Daughter of Maria Lourdes "Baby" Araneta-Fores and a granddaughter of J. Amado Araneta.
Bianca Araneta-Elizalde - wife of Juan Manuel H. Elizalde.
 Irene R. Marcos-Araneta - daughter of former President Ferdinand Marcos and former First Lady Imelda Marcos. Married to Gregorio Maria Araneta III. 
Mariano V. Araneta - current President of the Philippine Football Federation
Manuel L. Araneta Jr. - father of Louise C. Araneta-Marcos, father-in-law of President Bongbong Marcos.
Stella Márquez-Araneta - former pageant director and Colombian beauty queen. Wife of Jorge L. Araneta.
Gemma Cruz-Araneta - politician, writer, director, and the first Asian to win the Miss International crown in 1964. Daughter of Carmen Guerrero Nakpil, great-grandniece of Jose Rizal, and married to Antonio Araneta, Jr.
Carmen Zaragoza y Roxas - artist. Married to Gregorio S. Araneta

The Araneta Group

The Araneta Group is a private and diversified company established owned by the Araneta Family since 1954 that holds the key businesses established by J. Amado Araneta. During Amado's leadership, he expanded the family's real estate businesses, farmlands, and sugar plantations. The company is currently owned by Amado's son, Jorge L. Araneta since 1970, and presently owns, operates and invests in Real Estate Development, Investments, Leisure & Entertainment, Fast Food Restaurant franchises, and Hospitality businesses.

History
The Araneta Group began its operations in 1908 as a diversified company, until the company's ownership was transferred to J. Amado Araneta, with interests in real estate and agriculture sectors, particularly in the sugar plantations industry. As the family's sugar plantations in Negros Island continue to grow during the country's recovery from World War 2, Amado purchased  of land, located within Highway 54 (now EDSA), Aurora Boulevard, and P. Tuazon Boulevard, from the Radio Corporation of America (RCA) in 1954, and purchased the remaining  a year later. Amado merged his companies in 1954 and began his real estate developments in the area in 1956, as he sold a portion of the property to the Philippine National Bank, in order for the company to set up a branch within while maintaining ownership on the property's land, and later erected the first Aguinaldo Department Store beyond Manila, while relocating his company's offices to the area. In 1957, Amado launched one of his largest projects, the Araneta Coliseum and was completed in 1960. Since then, Amado inaugurated many buildings in the complex, such as the Araneta Enterprise Building in 1956, the New Frontier Theater in 1967, and the Coliseum Farmers Market and Shopping Center in 1969.

As time grew by, Amado expanded his business until his retirement in 1970, when his son, Jorge L. Araneta took helm of his company and his businesses. Since then, the company expanded it's interests and investments from real estate, agriculture, investments and entertainment to fast food restaurant franchises in the 1970s, after the purchase of franchising rights of Pizza Hut, and lodging sectors, after the grand opening of the Novotel Manila Araneta City in 2015. Correspondingly, the company is regarded as one of the pioneers of the country's entertainment and leisure development sectors, and serves as one of the biggest private conglomerates in the country.

Subsidiaries
Araneta City, Inc. (ACI) - founded in 1960 after the opening of the Araneta Coliseum, ACI is the owner, developer, and manager of the Araneta City in Cubao, Quezon City. The area serves over 1 million people daily.
United Promotions, Inc. (Uniprom) - manages the ticketing company TicketNet Online and the leisure and entertainment ventures of the Araneta City (Smart Araneta Coliseum, Kia Theatre, Gateway Mall Cineplex 10 and Ali Mall Cinemas). Aside from providing venues to notable sports events and local and international shows, Uniprom also produces and promotes internationally acclaimed sports and entertainment shows like the World Slasher Cup, and the annual Binibining Pilipinas beauty pageant. Uniprom has also been involved in a 26-year partnership with the producers of Disney on Ice, which has been held annually at the Smart Araneta Coliseum.
Philippine Pizza, Inc. (PPI) - the franchise owner of Pizza Hut, Taco Bell, and Dairy Queen in the Philippines, operating over 300 restaurants nationwide. 
Progressive Development Corporation (PDC) - manages investments and property assets of the Araneta Group outside of the three strategic business units (Araneta Center, Philippine Pizza Inc., and Uniprom). The group's major properties are in San Mateo, Rizal, Rodriguez, Rizal and Bacolod. Other assets include holdings in Atok Big-Wedge, a listed mining holding company; investments in Wenphil and Philippine Seven, local franchisees of world-renowned brands Wendy's and 7-Eleven respectively; The Peninsula Manila luxury hotel, and tertiary hospital Makati Medical Center, both located within the Makati Central Business District. The PDC is also a business incubator for new ventures. 
Araneta Hotels, Inc. (AHI) - owner and developer of Novotel Manila Araneta City, the first Novotel brand of AccorHotels in the Philippines, as well as the future Ibis Styles Araneta City, the first Ibis Styles brand in the Philippines.
Manhattan Gardens (MG) - a ₱15 Billion, 9,000 unit, 18-tower joint venture residential project with Megaworld Corporation occupying  of the Araneta City, consisting 4 phases, known as the Manhattan Parkway, Manhattan Parkview, Manhattan Heights, and the Manhattan Plaza. The project is also the first transit-oriented residential development in the country.

Non Profit Initiative
J. Amado Araneta Foundation (JAAF)- a non-profit, social development arm of the Araneta Group.

Other Aranetas in business
Salvador Z. Araneta founded RFM Corporation, which began as a flour miller.

LBC Express, founded as the Luzon Brokerage Corporation, was founded by Carlos "Linggoy" Araneta. The company's current CEO is Miguel Angel A. Camahort.

Ramon Araneta ventured into advertising through Ace Advertising Agency (AAA) (now known as Ace Saatchi & Saatchi, wholly owned by the France-based Publicis group through its Saatchi & Saatchi network of agencies).

Joachim Araneta Durante, standing as the CEO of his own beach resort in Siargao Island and Hotel in Cebu City.

Sources

See also
Araneta Group
Araneta City
Smart Araneta Coliseum
Ali Mall
De La Salle Araneta University
Gateway Mall (Araneta City)
Gateway Tower (Cubao)
Iloilo
Farmers Plaza
Politics of the Philippines
Negros Occidental & Negros Oriental
Negros Revolution
Bago

References

 
Filipino families
Filipino people of Basque descent
Filipino people of Spanish descent